Yang Siju (born 19 April 1973 in Qushi 曲石, Tengchong County, Yunnan) is a Chinese long-distance runner who specialized in the 10,000 metres.

She finished seventh at the 1997 World Championships in Athens in a time of 32:01.61 minutes.

Her personal best time was 31:16.39 minutes, achieved in October 1997 in Shanghai.

Achievements

References

1973 births
Living people
Chinese female long-distance runners
Athletes (track and field) at the 1996 Summer Olympics
Olympic athletes of China
Place of birth missing (living people)
People from Baoshan, Yunnan
Runners from Yunnan